John Spencer (10 August 1946 – 18 February 2021) was an Australian professional rugby league footballer who played in the 1960s and 1970s. He played for Balmain as a second rower and is the son of former Balmain player and premiership winner Jack Spencer.

Playing career
Spencer made his debut for Balmain in 1966 but was not a member of the side which reached the grand final that year. In 1969, Spencer was a part of the Balmain side which defeated Souths 11–2 at the Sydney Cricket Ground. The match is still considered to this day to be one of the greatest grand final upsets in history. This would prove to be the last premiership Balmain would win as a stand-alone entity before merging with the Western Suburbs Magpies to form the Wests Tigers at the end of 1999.

After some of the Balmain stars had retired or moved on, Spencer stayed with the club and captained the side during the early 1970s. He retired at the end of the 1975 season. At representative level he played for New South Wales on one occasion.

John Spencer died on 18 February 2021, aged 74. He had two children Kristi and  Jarryd.

References

1946 births
2021 deaths
Australian rugby league players
Balmain Tigers captains
Balmain Tigers players
New South Wales rugby league team players
Rugby league players from Sydney
Rugby league second-rows